Thomas Yates Walsh (1809January 20, 1865) was a U.S. Representative from Maryland.

Born in Baltimore, Maryland, Walsh completed preparatory studies and attended St. Mary's College at Baltimore (1821–1824).  He studied law, was admitted to the bar on July 30, 1832, and commenced practice in Baltimore.  He served as member of the city council in 1847 and 1848.

Walsh was elected as a Whig to the Thirty-second Congress (March 4, 1851 – March 3, 1853).  He was an unsuccessful candidate for reelection in 1852 to the Thirty-third Congress, and resumed the practice of law.  He died in Baltimore, Maryland, and is interred in St. Paul's Protestant Episcopal Cemetery.

References

1809 births
1865 deaths
Whig Party members of the United States House of Representatives from Maryland
19th-century American politicians